This is a list of Spanish television related events in 1999.

Events 
 30 March: Paolo Vasile relieves Maurizio Carlotti as ceo of Telecinco.
 21 August: Canary Islands Regional Channel Televisión Canaria is launched.

Debuts

Television shows

Ending this year

Foreign series debuts in Spain

Births 
 19 November - Denisse Peña, actress.

Deaths 
 2 January - Margot Cottens, actress, 76.
 8 February - Luis Sánchez Polack, humorista, 72.
 7 April - Nuria Carresi, actress, 58.
 18 April - Vicente Escrivá, director y guionista, 85.
 14 May - Francisco Eguiagaray, journalist, 65.
 6 November - José María Caffarel, actor, 79.

See also
1999 in Spain
List of Spanish films of 1999

References 

1999 in Spanish television